Osborne is a city in and the county seat of Osborne County, Kansas, United States.  As of the 2020 census, the population of the city was 1,335.

History
Settlers from southeastern Pennsylvania founded Osborne City in May 1871. They named the settlement after Vincent B. Osborne, a Union Army veteran of the American Civil War, after whom Osborne County also is named. Osborne City became the permanent county seat in November 1872. A district judge officially proclaimed it a city in May 1873, but the townspeople failed to legally organize a government. Five years later, a second attempt was successful, and the settlement incorporated as a city in 1878. "City" was dropped from its name by the mid-1890s.

A bridge was built at Osborne over the Solomon River in 1878.

Geography

Osborne lies on the north side of the South Fork Solomon River in the Smoky Hills region of the Great Plains. The Osborne Canal, part of the U.S. Bureau of Reclamation's Webster Unit Project, runs east along the northern edge of the city.

Climate
On average in Osborne, July is the warmest month, January is the coldest month, and May is the wettest month. The hottest temperature recorded in Osborne was 116 °F (47 °C) in 1940; the coldest temperature recorded was -31 °F (-35 °C) in 1989.

Demographics

2010 census
As of the census of 2010, there were 1,431 people, 633 households, and 390 families residing in the city. The racial makeup of the city was 97.7% White, 0.1% African American, 0.6% Native American, 0.5% Asian, 0.4% from other races, and 0.6% from two or more races. Hispanic or Latino of any race were 1.3% of the population.

There were 633 households, of which 27.3% had children under the age of 18 living with them, 50.4% were married couples living together, 7.6% had a female householder with no husband present, 3.6% had a male householder with no wife present, and 38.4% were non-families. 36.0% of all households were made up of individuals, and 18.6% had someone living alone who was 65 years of age or older. The average household size was 2.16 and the average family size was 2.79.

The median age in the city was 48.1 years. 21.7% of residents were under the age of 18; 5.8% were between the ages of 18 and 24; 17.1% were from 25 to 44; 28.6% were from 45 to 64; and 27% were 65 years of age or older. The gender makeup of the city was 48.3% male and 51.7% female.

The median income for a household in the city was $35,400, and the median income for a family was $51,042. Males had a median income of $34,200 versus $20,880 for females. The per capita income for the city was $19,902. About 8.3% of families and 11.8% of the population were below the poverty line, including 12.8% of those under age 18 and 13.8% of those age 65 or over.

2000 census
As of the census of 2000, there were 1,607 people, 693 households, and 419 families residing in the city. The racial makeup of the city was 97.88% White, 0.19% African American, 0.12% Native American, 0.19% Asian, 0.06% Pacific Islander, and 1.56% from two or more races. Hispanic or Latino of any race were 0.19% of the population.

There were 693 households, out of which 26.1% had children under the age of 18 living with them, 51.4% were married couples living together, 6.6% had a female householder with no husband present, and 39.5% were non-families. 37.2% of all households were made up of individuals, and 21.2% had someone living alone who was 65 years of age or older. The average household size was 2.22 and the average family size was 2.94.

In the city, the population was spread out, with 23.9% under the age of 18, 5.7% from 18 to 24, 22.1% from 25 to 44, 21.3% from 45 to 64, and 27.0% who were 65 years of age or older. The median age was 44 years. For every 100 females, there were 87.5 males. For every 100 females age 18 and over, there were 83.4 males.

Economy
As of 2013, 65.4% of the population over the age of 16 was in the labor force. 0.0% was in the armed forces, and 65.4% was in the civilian labor force with 62.8% being employed and 2.6% unemployed. The composition, by occupation, of the employed civilian labor force was:  28.7% in management, business, science, and arts; 27.4% in sales and office occupations; 18.3% in service occupations; 14.6% in production, transportation, and material moving; and 11.1% in natural resources, construction, and maintenance. The three industries employing the largest percentages of the working civilian labor force were:  educational services, health care, and social assistance (18.2%); wholesale trade (11.3%); and retail trade (10.5%).

The cost of living in Osborne is relatively low; compared to a U.S. average of 100, the cost of living index for the city is 79.4. As of 2013, the median home value in the city was $42,400, the median selected monthly owner cost was $627 for housing units with a mortgage and $329 for those without, and the median gross rent was $492.

Government
Osborne is a city of the second class with a mayor–council form of government. The city council consists of six members and meets on the first and third Wednesday of each month.

As the county seat, Osborne is the administrative center of Osborne County. The county courthouse is located downtown, and all departments of the county government base their operations in the city.

Osborne lies within Kansas's 1st U.S. Congressional District. For the purposes of representation in the Kansas Legislature, the city is located in the 36th district of the Kansas Senate and the 109th district of the Kansas House of Representatives.

Education

Osborne USD 392 provides public primary and secondary education, operating two schools in the city:  Osborne Elementary School (Grades K-6) and Osborne Junior/Senior High School (7-12).

Transportation
U.S. Route 281 runs north–south through Osborne, meeting U.S. Route 24, an east–west route, just north of the city. At the junction, U.S. 24 turns north and runs concurrently with U.S. 281.

Osborne Municipal Airport is located immediately southeast of the city. It is used primarily for general aviation.

Osborne is the western terminus of a line of the Kyle Railroad. The city is also the northwestern terminus of a line of the Kansas & Oklahoma Railroad.

Media
One newspaper is published in Osborne, the weekly Osborne County Farmer.

Osborne is in the Wichita-Hutchinson, Kansas television market.

Culture

Points of interest
The Osborne County Historical Museum exhibits artifacts from local history, including antique farm equipment, period clothing and housewares, and American Indian artifacts, and maintains on site a one-room school house built in 1912.

Notable people
Notable individuals who were born in and/or have lived in Osborne include:
 Chris Arpad (1967- ), steel drummer
 Fred Cornwell (1961- ), football tight end
 Edward L. Kessel (1904-1997), biologist
 Joe Miller (1967- ), judge, Alaska politician
 Elsie Reasoner Ralph (25 April 1878 - 29 April 1913), first female war correspondent in US history
 Lee Wykoff (1898-1974), Professional Wrestler

See also

 Meades Ranch Triangulation Station

References

Further reading

External links

 City of Osborne
 Osborne - Directory of Public Officials
 Historic Images - Wichita State University Libraries
 USD 392, local school district
 Osborne city map, KDOT

Cities in Osborne County, Kansas
Cities in Kansas
County seats in Kansas
1871 establishments in Kansas
Populated places established in 1871